Zosiama Pachuau was an Indian politician and member of the Mizoram People's Conference. Pachuau was a member of the Mizoram Legislative Assembly from the Kolasib constituency in Kolasib district. He was minister of Education. He was teacher by profession and joined Mizoram Board of School Education as chief academic officer before joining politics.

References 

People from Kolasib district
Mizoram People's Conference politicians
Mizoram MLAs 1993–1998
Living people
Mizoram politicians
21st-century Indian politicians
Year of birth missing (living people)
2017 deaths